The 2022 Danish Cup final was played on 26 May 2021 between OB and Midjylland at Brøndby Stadium, Brøndbyvester, a neutral ground. The final match was the culmination of the 2021–22 Danish Cup, the 68th season of the Sydbank Pokalen.

OB is appearing in its 7th Cup final, sporting a 5–1 record in cup finals. The club's last Cup title came in 2007.  Midtjylland, the Cup winner in 2019 and a 4-times runner up, will be competing in its 6th final.

The winner of the final will earn an automatic berth into the playoff round of the 2022–23 UEFA Europa League.

Teams
{| class="wikitable"
|-
!Team
!Previous finals appearances (bold indicates winners)
|-
|OB
|6 (1974, 1983, 1992, 1993, 2002, 2007)
|-
|Midtjylland
|5 (2003, 2005, 2010, 2011, 2019')
|-
|}

Venue
For just the fifth time in cup history, the final will be played in a venue other than the Copenhagen Sports Park (1955–1990), or Parken Stadium (1993–2019). Brøndby Stadium in Brøndbyvester will host the 2022 final. Odense Stadium hosted the 1991 final while the 1992 final was played at Aarhus Idrætspark.

Route to the finalNote: In all results below, the score of the finalist is given first (H: home; A: away).''

Match

Details

References

Danish Cup Finals
Danish Cup Final
Danish Cup Final
Sports competitions in Denmark
Odense Boldklub matches
FC Midtjylland matches
Danish Cup Final 2022